Time 107.5 is an independent local radio station, based in Romford and broadcasting to East London and parts of Essex.
The station strapline is "All Time Favourites" and the station is available on FM on 107.5 MHz in the broadcast area and online via its website.

As of December 2022, the station broadcasts to a weekly audience of 24,000, according to RAJAR.

History
The station launched as Active 107.5 FM and, after ten years of planning, went on air on 18 May 1998, broadcasting to east London and in particular to the London Boroughs of Havering and Barking & Dagenham. Active FM played a mix of new and old pop music with an emphasis on soul and rhythm and blues; evening shows catered for specialist musical tastes covering genres including disco, garage and contemporary club music. The station had its own local news team which would broadcast from Studio 2.

The station was run out of  Lambourne House, Romford and its transmitter was located on the roof.

Active FM was bought by UKRD Group which later ran the station as Soul City FM.

Time FM is the third name used by the station. It was adopted when the company was acquired by the London Media Company, a subdivision of the Sunrise Radio Group.
In January 2014, Time 107.5 LTD entered administration, along with its sister stations, Time 106.6, Sunrise Radio and Kismat Radio. On 4 February 2014 they were acquired for an estimated £2m by Lyca Media II Ltd, a subdivision of Lycamobile.  The station has retained its branding as 'Time 107.5FM'.

Programming
Time 107.5 plays a variety of music from the 1960s to the present day. News reports are live, in-house bulletins, with local stories covering the London Boroughs of Barking and Dagenham, Havering and Redbridge.

References

External links
Time 107.5  website
Lyca Radio  website
Lyca Gold website
Lyca Media Media.Info

Radio stations in Essex
Radio stations in London
Contemporary hit radio stations in the United Kingdom
Romford